The  is a kofun burial mound located in what is now part of the town of Wakasa, Fukui in the Hokuriku region of Japan. The tumulus was designated a National Historic Site of Japan in 1935.

Overview
The Kamifunazuka Kofun is one of a group of kofun located in the Hirano neighbourhood of central Wakasa town, forming the Jōnozuka Kofun Cluster. It is sandwiched between Japan National Route 27 and the tracks of the JR West Obama Line railway. The "neck" of the structure has a width of 20 meters, widening out towards the west, where the anterior rectangular portion has a width of 50 meters. The height of the tumulus is 16 meters. The entire structure is similar to that of the nearby Nishizuka Kofun. The Kamifunazuka Kofun was once covered with fukiishi, of which a portion remain, and the fragments of cylindrical haniwa have been found in the area. The kofun is also surrounded by a dry moat. 

The Kamifunazuka Kofun is believed to date from the early 6th century AD, or late in the Kofun period, but this tumulus has yet to be excavated by archaeologists. It may have been the grave a local king before Yamato dynasty control over the area of Wakasa was firmly established.  Per local legend, this tumulus is said to be the grave of one of the Kuni no miyatsuko of Wakasa Province. 

The tumulus is about a 13-minute walk from Shin-Hirano Station on the JR West Obama Line.

See also
List of Historic Sites of Japan (Fukui)
Shimofunazuka Kofun

References

External links

 Obama city home page 
Cultural Heritage of Fukui Prefecture 

Kofun
History of Fukui Prefecture
Wakasa, Fukui
Historic Sites of Japan
Wakasa Province